Pyroderces nephelopyrrha is a moth of the family Cosmopterigidae. It is found in Taiwan and India.

The wingspan is about 9 mm. The head is ochreous-whitish. The forewings are narrowly elongate-lanceolate and fuscous, with some undefined whitish-ochreous suffusion along the dorsum. There is an elongate spot of ochreous-whitish suffusion on the costa. The hindwings are rather dark grey.

References

Moths described in 1917
nephelopyrrha
Moths of Taiwan
Moths of Asia